Curriculum Vitae is a 1975 polish film written and directed by Krzysztof Kieślowski.

Plot 
A communist party control committee interrogates a worker and party activist who is to be excluded from the party.

External links

References 

1975 films
Films directed by Krzysztof Kieślowski
Films with screenplays by Krzysztof Kieślowski